Vladyslav Kondratiev (born February 19, 1990) is a Ukrainian professional basketball player for Budivelnyk Kyiv of the UA SuperLeague.

Studied at Bryant University playing three season for Bulldogs in NCAA.

External links
 FIBA Europe
 Vladysla Kondratiev at basketball.eurobasket.com

References 

BC Budivelnyk players
Ukrainian men's basketball players
1990 births
Living people
BC Kyiv players
BC Dnipro-Azot players
Forwards (basketball)
Sportspeople from Mykolaiv